The 2011 North Carolina Tar Heels football team represented the University of North Carolina at Chapel Hill as a member of Coastal Division of the Atlantic Coast Conference (ACC) during the 2011 NCAA Division I FBS football season. The team was led by interim head coach Everett Withers and played their home games at Kenan Memorial Stadium. The Tar Heels finished the season 7–6 overall and 3–5 in ACC play to tie for fourth in the Coastal Division. They were invited to the Independence Bowl, where they were defeated by Missouri, 24–41.

Recruiting
After National Signing Day (February 3, 2011) the Tar Heel's recruiting class was ranked as the 16th best class in the nation by the three major recruiting sites (espn.com, rivals.com, and scout.com). Marquise Williams (QB), Travis Riley (RB), T.J. Thorpe (Ath), Landon Turner (OG), and Sylvester Williams (DT) (Junior College Transfer) all enrolled in January 2011. The entire 2011 recruiting class included 26 players, 22 of which were either four-star or three-star recruits.

^Delvon Simmons requested to be released from his letter of intent in March 2011. He was granted release, and will not play for UNC.

Coaching staff
On July 27, 2011, UNC chancellor Holden Thorp announced that the UNC Board of Trustees decided to dismiss Butch Davis as the head coach of the football team.  The announcement comes a week before the start of fall training camp. The firing is due to the investigations by the NCAA into academic fraud, impermissible benefits, and talking to agents in the 2010 season. The next day on the 28th, Everett Withers, the defensive coordinator of the past 3 years, was named as the interim head coach.  Athletic director, Dick Baddour, also announced, on this day, that he would be stepping down from his role once a new athletic director is found for the university. Baddour added that he wanted the new athletic director to be in charge of hiring the university's next head football coach.

Roster

Schedule

Rankings

Game summaries

James Madison

This was the first ever game as a head coach for Everett Withers.  The Tar Heels never trailed in the game, scoring on the opening drive of the game with a 34 yard touchdown pass from Bryn Renner to Dwight Jones. The Heels gave up only one touchdown, which came off of the ensuing drive after a mishandled snap, which resulted in a blocked punt. In his first ever collegiate start, Bryn Renner set school and ACC records for the highest completion percentage (95.7%) in a single-game and was just shy of the NCAA record of 95.8% set in 1998 by Tennessee's Tee Martin.

Rutgers

North Carolina was able to hold on to a 2 point win despite turning the ball over 5 times (2 fumbles and 3 interceptions) and not having a single takeaway.  A key defensive stand came in the first quarter when a Rutgers interception was returned to the UNC 2 yard line. The UNC defense was able to hold the Rutgers offense and on 4th down from the 1 yard line held the line of scrimmage forcing a turnover on downs. The UNC defense was also able to hold Rutgers to only 1 yard rushing total for the game, the lowest total since holding Wake Forest to a negative 2 yards in 2000.

Virginia

With its win against Virginia, UNC started their ACC schedule with a win for the first time since 2001.  The Heels were able to effectively run the ball against the Cavaliers, finishing the game with 222 rushing yards by 8 different offensive players.  The Heels defense recorded their first takeaways of the young season when Matt Merletti recorded 2 interceptions in the fourth quarter to seal the Carolina victory.

Georgia Tech

Georgia Tech entered this meeting of unbeatens as one of the top offenses in the nation averaging 53.3 points and 675.3 yards a game. The UNC defense, however, was able to hold them to only 35 points and 496 yards. Trailing 28–14 in the fourth quarter, UNC rallied behind an Eric Ebron touchdown reception and a 55 yard Giovanni Bernard touchdown run to tie the game up with 7:22 left in the game. Georgia Tech took the lead for good with a Tevin Washington touchdown run with 5:20 remaining. With the win, Georgia Tech goes to 4–0 for the first time since their national championship season in 1990.

East Carolina

UNC did not commit a turnover in a game for the first time all season. They were +4 in the turnover margin for the game (2 fumble recoveries and 2 interceptions). Giovani Bernard became the first Tar Heel since Natrone Means in 1992 to rush for over 100 yards in 3 consecutive games. His 7 touchdowns through 5 games ties the individual high for Johnny White as the team leader for the year in 2011. The UNC offense continued to perform in the red-zone scoring touchdowns on 3 of 4 trips, bringing their season total to 15 touchdowns in 18 trips in the redzone. The defense, however, has held opponents to only 7 touchdowns in 18 trips into the redzone so far this year.

Louisville

Despite having the ball for 22:08 in the first half, Louisville only gained 173 yards of offense. This was, however, 113 more yards than UNC going into the locker rooms at the half. In the second half however, UNC outgained Louisville 202 to 95. Louisville's only score of the game came with only 42 seconds left to end the shutout for the UNC defense. Giovani Bernard became the first ever freshman running back to rush for over 100 yards in 4 straight games. With this win, UNC has won 8 straight games against non-conference opponents. Their last lost was against LSU in the Chick-fil-A Kickoff Game.

Miami (FL)

UNC gave up a touchdown in the first quarter for the first time this season. Miami took a 14–0 lead before UNC ever took the field on offense. Miami scored on their opening drive of the game and then, on the ensuing kick-off, recovered a fumble by kick returner T.J. Thorpe and scored on their next play from scrimmage. The Heels nearly made an improbable comeback when, down by 13, they scored a touchdown with 46 seconds remaining in the game. They then recovered the on-side kick on their own 44 yard line. They were able to advance the ball to the 30 yard line after a 15 yard pass reception by Dwight Jones and an 11 yard reception by Giovani Bernard. Bernard also rushed for another 110 yards giving him 5 100+ yard games in a row. This ties for the second most in a season by a UNC freshman. The other two UNC freshmen with this record are Amos Lawrence (who finished with 6 in 1977) and Leon Johnson (who finished with 5 in 1993).

Clemson

The Tar Heels turned the ball over 6 times in their 59–38 loss to Clemson. This was the most points allowed by UNC since they gave up 69 to Louisville in 2005. UNC was only down by 7 going into the half and their defense had only allowed 15 yards of rushing up to that point. However, Clemson's 35 points in the third quarter became only the second time in school history to accomplish this feat, the only other time being by the 1981 National Championship team. T.J. Thorpe became only the second Tar Heel in history to record a kickoff return of 100 yards for a touchdown.

Wake Forest

With their win over Wake Forest, North Carolina became bowl eligible for the 4th straight year. The Tar Heel defense caused 5 Deacon turnovers (3 interceptions and 2 fumbles) after Wake Forest had committed only 5 turnovers the entire season coming into the game. UNC's 49 points was the most they had scored in a game since their opener against William & Mary in 2004 and the most against an ACC opponent since the 2001 season. The Tar Heel defense was led by senior Zach Brown who had 9 tackles (2.5 for a loss), an interception, a sack, a forced fumble, and a fumble recovery.

NC State

The Tar Heels were shut out for the first time since a 7–0 loss to Georgia Tech in 2006, and their first shut out by NC State since 1960. Bryn Renner was knocked out of the game with concussion-like symptoms early in the second half. The UNC offense had its worst performance of the season, being held to a game low of 165 total yards. Giovani Bernard was, however, able to become the 15th Tar Heel to rush for 1,000 yards in a season and the third freshman to rush for 1,000 yards. The only point in the game in which it seemed UNC was going to put points on the scoreboard was on a 75 yard touchdown reception by Dwight Jones that was called back because of holding on the offensive line.

Virginia Tech

Virginia Tech's Logan Thomas fumbled on the first play from scrimmage when he was sacked by Sylvester Williams. This set up UNC with a 3 play, 20 yard drive that concluded with a Giovani Bernard 4 yard touchdown. After preventing Virginia Tech from converting a 4th down on the UNC 26 yard line, the Heels drove the length of the field to the 5 yard line where Ryan Houston fumbled the ball and it was recovered by the Hokies. The last time that UNC and Virginia Tech played on Thursday night was in 2009 when Virginia Tech fumbled the ball on a drive in the fourth quarter that eventually lead to a UNC victory. After coming 5 yards from taking a 14-0 lead, UNC found itself giving up 24 unanswered points to the Hokies by the fourth quarter. However, with 7:06 left in the game, Bryn Renner completed a pass to Erik Highsmith to reduce the lead to 10 points. After forcing the Hokies to punt on their next possession, Renner completed a 25 yard pass to Dwight Jones, then a 64 yard pass to Erik Highsmith to the 2 yard line where Houston punched the ball into the endzone to cut the lead to 3 with 2:32 left in the game. The Heels recovered the onside kick on the subsequent kick-off, but upon further review, it was judged that the ball did not travel the required 10 yards on the kickoff which gave the Hokies the ball. They were able to run the clock down to where only one play would be left for UNC, who was not able to convert it into a touchdown.

Duke

UNC beat Duke for an 8th straight year, the last lose coming in 2003. Dwight Jones broke the single season reception record with 79 receptions for the season. The previous record of 74 receptions was held by Hakeem Nicks. Bryn Renner tied the single season record for most passing touchdowns with 23. In addition, Giovani Bernard ran for a season high 165 rushing yards. Duke quarterback, Sean Renfree, was taken out of the game during the third quarter due to numbness and swelling in his right hand. Because of this, Anthony Boone saw the most snaps of his freshman year and lead the Blue Devils in rushing for the game.

Missouri–Independence Bowl

NFL Draft

References

North Carolina
North Carolina Tar Heels football seasons
North Carolina Tar Heels football